Backside may refer to:

Frontside and backside, terms in action sports for whether the athlete faces toward or away from an obstacle
Backside, a term for the buttocks
Backside, a term in horse racing for the area behind a racetrack

See also
Back Sides, a 2006 album by Lazlo Bane